Martinsville Northside Historic District is a national historic district located at Martinsville, Morgan County, Indiana.  The district encompasses 96 contributing buildings and 11 contributing structures in a predominantly residential section of Martinsville.  It developed between about 1850 and 1935, and includes notable examples of Queen Anne and Bungalow/American Craftsman style architecture.  Notable buildings include the Brown-Haworth House (c. 1923), William R. Harrison House / Bates House (c. 1860), St. Martin of Tours Roman Catholic Church (1889), Elliott House (1865), Kriner House (c. 1930), and Schofield-Maxwell House (c. 1875).  The formerly listed Hite-Finney House was located in the district.

It was listed on the National Register of Historic Places in 1997.

References

Historic districts on the National Register of Historic Places in Indiana
Queen Anne architecture in Indiana
Bungalow architecture in Indiana
Historic districts in Morgan County, Indiana
National Register of Historic Places in Morgan County, Indiana